Johnny Nolan Robinson (born September 9, 1938) is a former American football player. He was primarily a safety, but also played on offense as a halfback and flanker early in his career. He played college football at Louisiana State University (LSU) for the Tigers.

Robinson played his entire twelve-year professional career with the Dallas Texans/Kansas City Chiefs of the American Football League (AFL) and later the National Football League (NFL). He led the AFL in interceptions with ten in 1966, and led the NFL in 1970 with ten. He had 57 interceptions during his career. Robinson is a   inductee to the Pro Football Hall of Fame, becoming the ninth member of the Chiefs' Super Bowl IV championship team to be inducted.

Early life
Born in Delhi, Louisiana, Robinson was an all-state football, tennis, and baseball player in high school. He became starting fullback in his freshman year at University High School at LSU in Baton Rouge. Robinson and his older brother, Tommy, won the national boys' junior tennis championship when they were at U-High, where their father, Dub Robinson, was the LSU tennis coach for forty years.

College career
Robinson committed to play college football at LSU under head coach Paul Dietzel; in his junior season in 1958, the Tigers won all ten games in the regular season, the Sugar Bowl, and the national championship.

Also while at LSU, he won the SEC tennis championship in singles and SEC doubles championship with his brother Tommy.

Professional career
Robinson was selected by the Dallas Texans (became the Kansas City Chiefs in 1963) in the first round of the 1960 AFL Draft, and selected third overall by the Detroit Lions in the 1960 NFL Draft. In his third season, the Texans won the 1962 AFL title with a 20–17 double-overtime victory over the two-time defending AFL champion Houston Oilers in the longest professional football league championship game ever played.

Robinson played in the first Super Bowl in early 1967. Three years later in Super Bowl IV, the underdog Chiefs decisively defeated the Minnesota Vikings, 23–7. Robinson played that game with three broken ribs he received in the previous game. Late in the first half, he picked up a Minnesota fumble and made an interception in the second half to help seal the win.

During his first two years in the AFL, Robinson played flanker on offense, rushing for 658 yards on 150 carries and had 1,228 receiving yards on 77 receptions, and fifteen touchdowns. He was moved to safety after his second year and continued as a standout for ten of his twelve years. His last game came on Christmas Day 1971, when the Chiefs lost to the Miami Dolphins 24–27 after 22 minutes and forty seconds of overtime. Robinson suffered a career-ending injury that game, which remains the longest game in NFL history, and the last NFL game in Municipal Stadium. Robinson thus played in the sport's longest championship game in 1962 and in its absolute longest game, each game closing out professional football in its respective stadium.

After twelve seasons with the same franchise, Robinson retired at age 33 in July 1972, prior to training camp.

Legacy
Robinson was a seven-time first-team All-Pro and three-time second-team All-Pro selection. He is a member of the All-time All-AFL Team and one of only 20 players who were in the AFL for its entire ten-year existence.

The Chiefs had a 35–1–1 record in games that Robinson made an interception. He is an inductee of the Louisiana Sports Hall of Fame, and was elected into the Pro Football Hall Of Fame in February , the ninth member inducted from the 1969 Chiefs; his bust at Canton was sculpted by Scott Myers.  Later that year, he was recognized as an SEC Football Legend for LSU.

Career statistics

Personal and later life
After he retired as a player, Robinson was a scout for the Chiefs until Hank Stram was fired in 1974. He then coached defensive backs for the Jacksonville Express of the World Football League in 1975. The league folded that year, and he became a scout for the New Orleans Saints, again under Stram.

Robinson founded and operates a youth home called Johnny Robinson's Boys Home for troubled boys in Monroe, Louisiana, and has been a long-time supporter of children's causes.

References

1938 births
American Conference Pro Bowl players
American Football League All-Star players
American Football League players
American football safeties
Dallas Texans (AFL) players
Kansas City Chiefs players
Living people
Louisiana–Monroe Warhawks football coaches
Louisiana State University Laboratory School alumni
LSU Tigers football players
LSU Tigers tennis players
People from Delhi, Louisiana
Players of American football from Louisiana
Sportspeople from Monroe, Louisiana
Pro Football Hall of Fame inductees